The Lac du Poisson Blanc (in English: Poisson-Blanc Lake) is a freshwater body of the municipality of Notre-Dame-du-Laus, in the Antoine-Labelle Regional County Municipality (MRC), in the administrative region of Laurentides, in Quebec, in Canada.

Geography 
The "Sables reservoir" is juxtaposed to the north of Lac du Poisson-Blanc. Lac du Poisson-Blanc is a tributary of the Lièvre River which is a tributary of the Ottawa River.

Toponymy 
The toponym "Lac du Poisson-Blanc" was formalized in 1931 to designate this reservoir, using the name of the original lake. The name of the lake was mentioned in 1914 by Eugène Rouillard. The name of the lake refers to the white fish that are abundant in its waters. The general name "Poisson Blanc" (White fish) refers to freshwater fish with pale, soft and rather bland flesh. For example, lake whitefish (Coregonus clupeaformis) which is a cold freshwater salmonid, is also commonly referred to as "white fish".

In 1914, on page 339 of his "Dictionary of rivers and lakes of the Province of Quebec", the explorer Rouillard relates that "In one of the bays of this lake is a remarkable cave called" The grotto of the Church".

The toponym "lac du Poisson-Blanc" was made official on 5 December 1968 at the Place Names Bank of the Commission de toponymie du Québec.

See also 

 List of lakes of Canada

References 

Reservoirs in Quebec
Lakes of Laurentides
Antoine-Labelle Regional County Municipality